(born October 7, 1974) is a Japanese mixed martial artist currently competing in the Lightweight division. A professional competitor since 1994, he is best known for his clever and deceptive fighting style, and for his flashy ring entrances. Gono has competed for the UFC, PRIDE Fighting Championships, Pancrase, the World Series of Fighting, DEEP, World Victory Road, Shooto, Bellator, and also participated in the Dynamite!! 2009 event.

Mixed martial arts career

Shooto and Pancrase
Akihiro Gono began fighting mixed martial arts in 1994, competing in the Lumax Cup tournaments as a sambo representative. He got a win over Kazunari Murakami via head kick, but lost to him in their rematch the next year. Gono originally debuted in Fighting Network Rings's undercard, but he moved to Shooto after the Lumax Cup. His run there was uneventful, although he drew Jutaro Nakao and led Matt Hughes to a decision in his first years.  2000 would be his breakout year, winning against veteran Masanori Suda, against Ivan Salaverry via spinning kick and drawing with Murilo "Ninja" Rua.

Gono left Shooto for Pancrase in 2001 and became a member of Sanae Kikuta's Grabaka team. He again showed improvement, beating twice renowned Keiichiro Yamamiya and Chris Haseman and having a spirited match with Yuki Kondo, as well as a draw with Chael Sonnen. He stopped fighting for Pancrase in 2005 in order to focus in PRIDE Fighting Championships, though still as a Grabaka member.

PRIDE Fighting Championships
He began fighting in PRIDE Bushido with Bushido 2 in 2004, facing Murilo's brother Maurício "Shogun" Rua. Gono avoided Rua's first flurries with an elusive style, throwing Rua to the mat twice, but he was knocked out via punches and kicks when Rua finally caught him. However, Akihiro recovered from his defeat at his next event, facing Gracie family member Rodrigo Gracie. The match was heated, as Rodrigo had submitted Gono's fellow shooter Hayato Sakurai in his debut while Gono had defeated Cesar Gracie's student Tim McKenzie back in Pancrase. During the match, Gono traded strikes with Gracie and was taken down and pressed at the first round, but he came back at the second, stopping takedowns and capitalizing with strikes, including a head stomp which bloodied Gracie.

In September 2005, Akihiro took part in the PRIDE Welterweight Grand Prix. He became controversial for criticizing Ryo Chonan and Masanori Suda's performances and right to fight in the tournament, somewhat they called off on him back. At the first round, Gono won an upset over Daniel Acacio, showing one more time his ability to avoid damage in stand-up and counterattack. The same night, at the second round, he faced Dan Henderson, suffering an accidental headbutt before losing the match by KO.

In 2006, Gono returned to PRIDE, this time playing a new character, DJ Gozma, a parody of Japanese musician DJ OZMA. His entrances involved Gono wearing a vintage suit, including shoes and an orange wig, and accompanied by oddly-dressed male dancers while the song age♂age♂EVERY☆Night by DJ OZMA played in the background. Also, when the fighters were introduced in the ring, Gono would drop his suit's pants to reveal zebra stripped fighting briefs.

He participated in the next edition of the Welterweight Grand Prix, defeating Cuban Olympic judoka Hector Lombard on the first round. Characteristically, Gono avoided the damage from Lombard's aggressive initial combinations and countered him with hard punches, keeping his hands unorthodoxly low and throwing spinning backfists. His next round match would be against Gegard Mousasi, which he won again, deflecting his attacks and working an armbar for the tap out. However, Gono was eliminated at the semifinals by Denis Kang.

Gono's last apparition in Pride was at Shockwave 2006, fighting a revenge match with Yuki Kondo which came from their Pancrase days. Despite injuring his hand earlier in the match, Gono won the match by unanimous decision.

Ultimate Fighting Championship
Gono defeated Tamdan McCrory at UFC 78, by submission due to an Armbar at 3:19 of the second round. It was reported (first by Dave Meltzer) that he came out to his usual entrance with his DJ GOZMA persona.

Gono then took on Dan Hardy at UFC 89, but suffered defeat via split decision. Gono was left swollen and bloodied by several of Hardy's left hooks. Gono rocked Hardy on more than one occasion. In the third round Gono pushed Hardy to the canvas, and subsequently landed an illegal knee to the face of the downed fighter. This caused the fight to be stopped for a short period. Hardy recovered and went on to win the split decision. The judges saw the bout 29-28 (twice) for Hardy, and 29-28 for Gono.

Gono lost to Jon Fitch in a preliminary bout at UFC 94: St. Pierre vs. Penn 2. Following his loss to Jon Fitch, Gono was released from the UFC. He left the company with a 1-2 record.

Sengoku
After being released by the Ultimate Fighting Championship, Gono fought Dan Hornbuckle at World Victory Road Presents: Sengoku 9 losing via head kick knockout in the third round.

Gono then fought Yoon Young Kim at World Victory Road Presents: Sengoku 11 winning the fight via unanimous decision.

Gono fought fellow PRIDE veteran Hayato Sakurai at Dynamite!! 2009 winning the fight via armbar, late in the second round.

Gono fought Diego Gonzalez at World Victory Road Presents: Sengoku Raiden Championships 12 winning the fight via unanimous decision.

Gono made his Lightweight debut against Kyokushin kaikan expert Jadamba Narantungalag at World Victory Road Presents: Sengoku Raiden Championships 14 on August 22, 2010. He lost the fight via unanimous decision.

ONE Fighting Championship
Gono was photographed in the VIP area at ONE Fighting Championship: Champion vs. Champion leading to multiple websites speculating that he was about to sign a multi-fight deal with ONE Fighting Championship.

Bellator and first retirement
After losing to Michael Chandler at Bellator 67 on May 4, 2012, Gono announced his first retirement from MMA.

Return to MMA
Just under a year after he announced his retirement, Gono returned to MMA when he faced Taisuke Okuno at DEEP: 62nd Impact on April 26, 2013. He lost the fight by KO. Gono then fought to a draw against Yuki Okano at DEEP – Cage Impact 2013 on November 24, 2013.

Training and fighting in Brazil
After training for months in Brazil at Oxygym in the city of Gramado, Gono back to action facing Brazilian prospect Eduardo Garvon at The Hill Fighters 1 in his Brazilian home-town city of Gramado. Gono had problems in the standup fight against the taller Brazilian, but seconds away for the end of the fight, Gono submitted Garvon via technical submission (arm-triangle choke).

He won his second fight in Brazil at The Hill Fighters 2 against André de Jesus via split decision.

Kickboxing
He lost to Bovy Sor Udomson via TKO (referee stoppage) in round one at Shootboxing 2012: Act 4 on September 17, 2012, in Tokyo, Japan, failing to qualify for the 2012 S-Cup.

He lost to Satoru Suzuki by TKO at the end of round one in a reserve bout at the Shoot Boxing World Tournament 2012 in Tokyo, Japan on November 17, 2012.

Mixed martial arts record 

|-
| Loss
| align=center| 36–24–8
| Yuki Kondo
| Decision (unanimous)
| Pancrase: 305
| 
| align=center| 3
| align=center| 3:00
| Tokyo, Japan
|
|-
| Loss
| align=center| 36–23–8
| Adriano Balby
| Decision (split)
| Rebel FC 7: Fight for Honour
| 
| align=center| 3
| align=center| 5:00
| Shanghai, China
|
|-
| Win
| align=center| 36–22–8
| Kyohei Wakimoto
| Decision (split)
| Pancrase: 293
| 
| align=center| 3
| align=center| 3:00
| Tokyo, Japan
|Return to Welterweight.
|-
| Loss
| align=center| 35–22–8
| Akira Okada
| Decision (unanimous)
| Pancrase: 290
| 
| align=center| 3
| align=center| 5:00
| Tokyo, Japan
|
|-
| Loss
| align=center| 35–21–8
| Killys Mota
| TKO (punches)
| Fight 2 Night 2
| 
| align=center| 3
| align=center| 1:55
| Foz do Iguaçu, Brazil
|
|-
| Win
| align=center| 35–20–8
| Akhmat Akhmedov
| Decision (split)
| Real Fight Championship 5
| 
| align=center| 2
| align=center| 5:00
| Tokyo, Japan
|
|-
| Loss
| align=center| 34–20–8
| Miroslav Strbak
| KO (punches)
| WSOF Global Championship 2
| 
| align=center| 2
| align=center| 2:42
| Tokyo, Japan
|
|-
| Win
| align=center| 34–19–8
| Andre de Jesus
| Decision (split)
| THF: The Hill Fighters 2
| 
| align=center| 3
| align=center| 5:00
| Gramado, Brazil
|
|-
| Win
| align=center| 33–19–8
| Eduardo Garvon
| Technical Submission (arm-triangle choke)
| THF: The Hill Fighters 1
| 
| align=center| 3
| align=center| 4:58
| Gramado, Brazil
|Return to Lightweight.
|-
| Draw
| align=center| 32–19–8
| Yuki Okano
| Draw (split)
| DEEP: Cage Impact 2013
| 
| align=center| 3
| align=center| 5:00
| Tokyo, Japan
|Welterweight bout.
|-
| Loss
| align=center| 32–19–7
| Taisuke Okuno
| KO (punch)
| DEEP: 62nd Impact
| 
| align=center| 2
| align=center| 2:07
| Tokyo, Japan
|Welterweight bout.
|-
| Loss
| align=center| 32–18–7
| Michael Chandler
| TKO (punches)
| Bellator 67
| 
| align=center| 1
| align=center| 0:56
| Rama, Ontario, Canada
| Announced retirement at the post-fight press conference.
|-
| Loss
| align=center| 32–17–7
| Daisuke Nakamura
| Decision (unanimous)
| DEEP – 57th Impact
| 
| align=center| 3
| align=center| 5:00
| Tokyo, Japan
| Welterweight bout.
|-
| Loss
| align=center| 32–16–7
| Jadamba Narantungalag
| Decision (unanimous)
| World Victory Road Presents: Sengoku Raiden Championships 14
| 
| align=center| 3
| align=center| 5:00
| Tokyo, Japan
| Lightweight debut.
|-
| Win
| align=center| 32–15–7
| Diego Gonzalez
| Decision (unanimous)
| World Victory Road Presents: Sengoku Raiden Championships 12
| 
| align=center| 3
| align=center| 5:00
| Tokyo, Japan
| 
|-
| Win
| align=center| 31–15–7
| Hayato Sakurai
| Submission (armbar)
| Dynamite!! The Power of Courage 2009
| 
| align=center| 2
| align=center| 3:56
| Saitama, Saitama, Japan
| 
|-
| Win
| align=center| 30–15–7
| Yoon Young Kim
| Decision (unanimous)
| World Victory Road Presents: Sengoku 11
| 
| align=center| 3
| align=center| 5:00
| Tokyo, Japan
| 
|-
| Loss
| align=center| 29–15–7
| Dan Hornbuckle
| KO (head kick)
|World Victory Road Presents: Sengoku 9
| 
| align=center| 3
| align=center| 2:50
| Saitama, Saitama, Japan
| 
|-
| Loss
| align=center| 29–14–7
| Jon Fitch
| Decision (unanimous)
| UFC 94
| 
| align=center| 3
| align=center| 5:00
| Las Vegas, Nevada, United States
| 
|-
| Loss
| align=center| 29–13–7
| Dan Hardy
| Decision (split)
| UFC 89
| 
| align=center| 3
| align=center| 5:00
| Birmingham, England
| 
|-
| Win
| align=center| 29–12–7
| Tamdan McCrory
| Submission (armbar)
| UFC 78
| 
| align=center| 2
| align=center| 3:19
| Newark, United States
| Returned to Welterweight; won Submission of the Night honors.
|-
| Win
| align=center| 28–12–7
| Yuki Kondo
| Decision (split)
| PRIDE FC: Shockwave 2006
| 
| align=center| 2
| align=center| 5:00
| Saitama, Japan
| 
|-
| Loss
| align=center| 27–12–7
| Denis Kang
| Decision (unanimous)
| PRIDE: Bushido 13
| 
| align=center| 2
| align=center| 5:00
| Yokohama, Japan
| PRIDE 2006 Welterweight (83 kg) Grand Prix Semifinal.
|-
| Win
| align=center| 27–11–7
| Gegard Mousasi
| Submission (armbar)
| PRIDE: Bushido 12
| 
| align=center| 2
| align=center| 4:24
| Nagoya, Japan
| PRIDE 2006 Welterweight (83 kg) Grand Prix Quarterfinal.
|-
| Win
| align=center| 26–11–7
| Hector Lombard
| Decision (unanimous)
| PRIDE: Bushido 11
| 
| align=center| 2
| align=center| 5:00
| Saitama, Japan
| PRIDE 2006 Welterweight (83 kg) Grand Prix Opening Round.
|-
| Win
| align=center| 25–11–7
| Dae Won Kim
| Submission (armbar)
| PRIDE: Bushido 10
| 
| align=center| 1
| align=center| 9:00
| Tokyo, Japan
| 
|-
| Loss
| align=center| 24–11–7
| Dan Henderson
| KO (punch)
| PRIDE Bushido 9
| 
| align=center| 1
| align=center| 7:58
| Tokyo, Japan
| PRIDE 2005 Welterweight (83 kg) Grand Prix Semifinal.
|-
| Win
| align=center| 24–10–7
| Daniel Acacio
| Decision (unanimous)
| PRIDE Bushido 9
| 
| align=center| 2
| align=center| 5:00
| Tokyo, Japan
| PRIDE 2005 Welterweight (83 kg) Grand Prix Opening Round.
|-
| Win
| align=center| 23–10–7
| Crosley Gracie
| Decision
| PRIDE Bushido 7
| 
| align=center| 2
| align=center| 5:00
| Tokyo, Japan
| 
|-
| Win
| align=center| 22–10–7
| Tim McKenzie
| TKO (punches)
| Pancrase: Brave 10
| 
| align=center| 2
| align=center| 2:53
| Urayasu, Chiba, Japan
| 
|-
| Win
| align=center| 21–10–7
| Tsuyoshi Kurihara
| KO (punch)
| Pancrase: Brave 6
| 
| align=center| 1
| align=center| 2:15
| Tokyo, Japan
| 
|-
| Loss
| align=center| 20–10–7
| Maurício Rua
| TKO (soccer kick)
| PRIDE Bushido 2
| 
| align=center| 1
| align=center| 9:04
| Yokohama, Japan
|Middleweight (93 kg) bout.
|-
| Win
| align=center| 20–9–7
| Nilson de Castro
| Decision (unanimous)
| Pancrase: Hybrid 10
| 
| align=center| 3
| align=center| 5:00
| Tokyo, Japan
| 
|-
| Win
| align=center| 19–9–7
| Daisuke Watanabe
| KO (punch)
| Pancrase: Hybrid 9
| 
| align=center| 2
| align=center| 3:49
| Tokyo, Japan
| 
|-
| Win
| align=center| 18–9–7
| Nilson de Castro
| DQ (groin strike)
| Pancrase: 10th Anniversary Show
| 
| align=center| 1
| align=center| 0:29
| Tokyo, Japan
| 
|-
| Win
| align=center| 17–9–7
| Flavio Luiz Moura
| Decision (majority)
| Pancrase: Hybrid 5
| 
| align=center| 2
| align=center| 5:00
| Tokyo, Japan
| 
|-
| Win
| align=center| 16–9–7
| Chris Haseman
| Decision (majority)
| ZST 2: The Battle Field 2
| 
| align=center| 3
| align=center| 5:00
| Tokyo, Japan
|Heavyweight bout.
|-
|  Draw
| align=center| 15–9–7
| Chael Sonnen
| Draw
| Pancrase: Hybrid 2
| 
| align=center| 2
| align=center| 5:00
| Tokyo, Japan
| 
|-
| Win
| align=center| 15–9–6
| Keiichiro Yamamiya
| TKO (punches)
| Pancrase: Spirit 9
| 
| align=center| 3
| align=center| 3:49
| Tokyo, Japan
| 
|-
|  Draw
| align=center| 14–9–6
| Osami Shibuya
| Draw
| Pancrase: Spirit 6
| 
| align=center| 3
| align=center| 5:00
| Tokyo, Japan
| 
|-
| Win
| align=center| 14–9–5
| Kousei Kubota
| Decision (unanimous)
| Pancrase: Spirit 4
| 
| align=center| 3
| align=center| 5:00
| Tokyo, Japan
| 
|-
| Loss
| align=center| 13–9–5
| Yuki Kondo
| TKO (corner stoppage)
| Pancrase: Proof 7
| 
| align=center| 3
| align=center| 0:52
| Tokyo, Japan
| 
|-
| Win
| align=center| 13–8–5
| Keiichiro Yamamiya
| Decision (unanimous)
| Pancrase: Proof 6
| 
| align=center| 3
| align=center| 5:00
| Tokyo, Japan
| 
|-
|  Draw
| align=center| 12–8–5
| Dustin Denes
| Draw
| DEEP: 2nd Impact
| 
| align=center| 3
| align=center| 5:00
| Tokyo, Japan
| 
|-
| Win
| align=center| 12–8–4
| Daisuke Watanabe
| TKO (doctor stoppage)
| Pancrase: Proof 4
| 
| align=center| 2
| align=center| 0:52
| Tokyo, Japan
| 
|-
|  Draw
| align=center| 11–8–4
| Murilo Rua
| Draw
| Shooto: To The Top 4
| 
| align=center| 3
| align=center| 5:00
| Tokyo, Japan
| 
|-
| Win
| align=center| 11–8–3
| Ivan Salaverry
| KO (spinning back kick)
| Shooto: To The Top 1
| 
| align=center| 1
| align=center| 3:06
| Tokyo, Japan
| 
|-
| Win
| align=center| 10–8–3
| Masanori Suda
| Decision (unanimous)
| Shooto: R.E.A.D. 12
| 
| align=center| 3
| align=center| 5:00
| Tokyo, Japan
| 
|-
| Win
| align=center| 9–8–3
| Andy Wang
| Decision (unanimous)
| Shooto: R.E.A.D. 5
| 
| align=center| 3
| align=center| 5:00
| Tokyo, Japan
| 
|-
|  Draw
| align=center| 8–8–3
| Larry Papadopoulos
| Decision (draw)
| Shooto: R.E.A.D. 1
| 
| align=center| 3
| align=center| 5:00
| Tokyo, Japan
| 
|-
| Loss
| align=center| 8–8–2
| Lance Gibson
| Decision (majority)
| SB 13: SuperBrawl 13
| 
| align=center| 3
| align=center| 5:00
| Honolulu, Hawaii, United States
| 
|-
| Loss
| align=center| 8–7–2
| Matt Hughes
| Decision (unanimous)
| Shooto: 10th Anniversary Event
| 
| align=center| 3
| align=center| 5:00
| Yokohama, Kanagawa, Japan
| 
|-
|  Draw
| align=center| 8–6–2
| Marcos da Silva
| Draw
| Shooto: Devilock Fighters
| 
| align=center| 3
| align=center| 5:00
| Tokyo, Japan
| 
|-
| Win
| align=center| 8–6–1
| Adriano de Souza
| Submission (armbar)
| Shooto: Las Grandes Viajes 6
| 
| align=center| 1
| align=center| 2:46
| Tokyo, Japan
| 
|-
| Win
| align=center| 7–6–1
| Matt Rocca
| Submission (armbar)
| Shooto: Shoot the Shooto XX
| 
| align=center| 1
| align=center| 3:12
| Tokyo, Japan
| 
|-
| Loss
| align=center| 6–6–1
| Larry Papadopoulos
| Decision (split)
| Shooto: Reconquista 4
| 
| align=center| 3
| align=center| 5:00
| Tokyo, Japan
| 
|-
|  Draw
| align=center| 6–5–1
| Jutaro Nakao
| Draw
| Shooto: Gig
| 
| align=center| 3
| align=center| 5:00
| Yokohama, Kanagawa, Japan
| 
|-
| Win
| align=center| 6–5
| Tsunemichi Nagano
| Decision (unanimous)
| Daidojuku: WARS 4
| 
| align=center| 5
| align=center| 3:00
| Tokyo, Japan
| 
|-
| Win
| align=center| 5–5
| Masato Fujiwara
| Decision (unanimous)
| Shooto: Reconquista 1
| 
| align=center| 4
| align=center| 3:00
| Tokyo, Japan
| 
|-
| Loss
| align=center| 4–5
| Kazuhiro Kusayanagi
| Submission (armbar)
| Shooto: Let's Get Lost
| 
| align=center| 4
| align=center| 2:52
| Japan
| 
|-
| Win
| align=center| 4–4
| Masanori Suda
| Submission (rear-naked choke)
| Shooto: Free Fight Kawasaki
| 
| align=center| 4
| align=center| 0:33
| Japan
| 
|-
| Loss
| align=center| 3–4
| Todd Bjornethun
| Submission (armbar)
| Shooto: Vale Tudo Junction 3
| 
| align=center| 3
| align=center| 1:12
| Japan
| 
|-
| Loss
| align=center| 3–3
| Kazunari Murakami
| Decision
| Lumax Cup: Tournament of J '96
| 
| align=center| 2
| align=center| 5:00
| Japan
| 
|-
| Win
| align=center| 3–2
| Yasushi Warita
| Submission (Achilles lock)
| Lumax Cup: Tournament of J '96
| 
| align=center| 1
| align=center| 0:54
| Japan
| 
|-
| Win
| align=center| 2–2
| Tatsuharu Doi
| Decision (majority)
| Daidojuku: WARS 3
| 
| align=center| 2
| align=center| 3:00
| Japan
| 
|-
| Loss
| align=center| 1–2
| Egan Inoue
| Submission (armbar)
| Lumax Cup: Tournament of J '95
| 
| align=center| 1
| align=center| 1:33
| Japan
| 
|-
| Win
| align=center| 1–1
| Kazunari Murakami
| KO (head kick)
| Lumax Cup: Tournament of J '95
| 
| align=center| 1
| align=center| 2:25
| Japan
| 
|-
| Loss
| align=center| 0–1
| Yasunori Okuda
| Submission (toe hold)
| Lumax Cup: Tournament of J '94
| 
| align=center| 1
| align=center| 1:51
| Japan
|

Mixed rules

| Win
|align=center| 1-0
| Tomoki Kanuka
| TKO (strikes)
| RINGS: Battle Genesis Vol.4
| 
|align=center| 1
|align=center| 2:27
| Nagoya, Japan
| 
|-

Submission grappling record
KO PUNCHES
|- style="text-align:center; background:#f0f0f0;"
| style="border-style:none none solid solid; "|Result
| style="border-style:none none solid solid; "|Opponent
| style="border-style:none none solid solid; "|Method
| style="border-style:none none solid solid; "|Event
| style="border-style:none none solid solid; "|Date
| style="border-style:none none solid solid; "|Round
| style="border-style:none none solid solid; "|Time
| style="border-style:none none solid solid; "|Notes
|-
|Loss|| Nino Schembri || Submission (rear-naked choke) || ADCC 2001 –88 kg || 2001|| 1|| 1:48||
|-
|Loss|| Izuru Takeuchi || Decision || ADCC 2000 Japan -88 kg || 2000 || 1|| 5:00||
|-
|Win|| Daisuke Igarashi || Submission (rear-naked choke) || ADCC 2000 Japan -88 kg || 2000|| 1|| 1:13||
|-
|Win|| Minoru Toyonaga || Decision || The CONTENDERS 2 || 1999|| 2|| 5:00|| 
|-
|Loss|| Ricardo Liborio || Decision || ADCC 1999 –88 kg || 1999|| 1|| 10:00||
|-

Kickboxing record 

|-
|
|Win
| Yuki Sakamoto
|Shootboxing 30th Anniversary Ground Zero Tokyo 2015
|Tokyo, Japan
|Decision
| style="text-align:center;"|4
| style="text-align:center;"|3:00
|11–7
|
|-
|
|Loss
| Bruce Codron
|World GBC Tour 9 
|Mazan, France
|Decision
| style="text-align:center;"|3
| style="text-align:center;"|3:00
|10-7
|
|-
|
|Win
| Singbird Sitbang
|Hero Legends
|Dunhuang, China
|Extra Round Decision
| style="text-align:center;"|4
| style="text-align:center;"|3:00
|10–6
|
|-
|
|Win
| Wu Go
|Hero Legends
|Dunhuang, China
|Extra Round Decision
| style="text-align:center;"|4
| style="text-align:center;"|3:00
|9–6
|
|-
|
|Win
| Bunking To
|Hero Legends
|Dunhuang, China
|Decision
| style="text-align:center;"|3
| style="text-align:center;"|3:00
|8–6
|
|-
|
|Win
| Sung Aki
|Hero Legends
|Dunhuang, China
|Decision
| style="text-align:center;"|3
| style="text-align:center;"|3:00
|7–6
|
|-
|
|Win
| Jun Hirayama
|Muay Thai Open 30
|Tokyo, Japan
|Decision
| style="text-align:center;"|3
| style="text-align:center;"|3:00
|6–6
|
|-
|
|Loss
| Satoru Suzuki
|Shoot Boxing World Tournament 2012
|Tokyo, Japan
|TKO (referee stoppage)
| style="text-align:center;"|1
| style="text-align:center;"|3:00
|5–6
|Reserve bout.
|-
|
|Loss
| Bovy Sor Udomson
|Shootboxing 2012 – Act 4
|Tokyo, Japan
|TKO (referee stoppage)
| style="text-align:center;"|1
| style="text-align:center;"|2:15
|5–5
|
|-
|
|Win
| “KID HMC” SAGE
|Deep Tokyo Impact 2012: Shootboxing S-Cup qualifier
|Tokyo, Japan
|Decision
| style="text-align:center;"|3
| style="text-align:center;"|3:00
|5-4
|
|-
|
|Loss
| Henri van Opstal
|Shoot the Shooto
|Tokyo, Japan
|Decision
| style="text-align:center;"|3
| style="text-align:center;"|3:00
|4–4
|
|-
|
|Loss
| Yohan Lidon
|Thai Fight Extreme
|Tokyo, Japan
|Decision
| style="text-align:center;"|3
| style="text-align:center;"|3:00
|4–3
|
|-
|
|Win
| Yamazaki Yoichi
|Thai Fight
|Japan
|Decision (unanimous)
| style="text-align:center;"|3
| style="text-align:center;"|3:00
|4–2
|
|-
|
|Win
| Daisuke Tsutsumi
|Thai Fight
|Japan
|Decision (unanimous)
| style="text-align:center;"|3
| style="text-align:center;"|3:00
|3–2
|
|-
|
|Loss
| Yuya Yamamoto
|Krush The First Championship Tournament ~Triple Final Round~
|Tokyo, Japan
|Decision (unanimous)
| style="text-align:center;"|3
| style="text-align:center;"|3:00
|2–2
|
|-
|
|Loss
| Yuji Sakuragi
|Pancrase 2005 Spiral Tour
|Japan
|KO (right straight)
| style="text-align:center;"|2
| style="text-align:center;"|1:17
|2–1
|
|-
|
|Win
| Kazushi Nishida
|AJKF: Moving
|Japan
|KO (right straight)
| style="text-align:center;"|4
| style="text-align:center;"|1:33
|2–0
|Wins AJKF Heavyweight (+72 kg) Championship.
|-
|
|Win
| Convoy Yamashita
|AJKF: Survivor
|Japan
|Decision (Unanimous)
| style="text-align:center;"|3
| style="text-align:center;"|3:00
|1–0
|
|-
| colspan=10 | Legend:

See also 
 List of male mixed martial artists

References

External links 
 
 PRIDE profile
 UFC profile

1974 births
Living people
Japanese male mixed martial artists
Lightweight mixed martial artists
Welterweight mixed martial artists
Mixed martial artists utilizing shootboxing
Mixed martial artists utilizing sambo
Mixed martial artists utilizing judo
Mixed martial artists utilizing catch wrestling
Japanese male kickboxers
Welterweight kickboxers
Japanese male judoka
Japanese catch wrestlers
Japanese sambo practitioners
People from Higashikurume, Tokyo
Ultimate Fighting Championship male fighters